Bazaine is a surname. Notable people with the surname include:

 Adolphe Bazaine-Vasseur (1809–1893), French railway engineer
 François Achille Bazaine (1811–1888), French military officer
 George Albert Bazaine-Hayter (1843–1914), French military officer
 Jean René Bazaine (1904–2001), French  painter, designer of stained glass windows, and writer
 Pierre-Dominique Bazaine (1786–1838), French mathematician and military engineer

French-language surnames